The Miracle Ultraviolence Connection is an American professional wrestling tag team currently performing on the independent circuit. Consisting of Cheech and Cloudy, the team has performed under a number of different names and also functioned as a stable called The Miracle Ultraviolence Connection from 2007 to 2008 with Brodie Lee as a member. Up In Smoke has achieved championship success in a number of promotions, including Independent Wrestling Association Mid-South, and has also seen greater exposure upon performing in other independent promotions such as Chikara, Combat Zone Wrestling, Ring of Honor, and Evolve.

Championships and accomplishments

Absolute Intense Wrestling
AIW Tag Team Championship (1 times) – Cheech with Colin Delaney
Alpha-1 Wrestling
Randy Poffo Invitational Tournament (2011) – Cheech
Independent Wrestling Association Mid-South
IWA Mid-South Tag Team Championship (1 time) – Cheech and Cloudy
International Wrestling Syndicate
IWS Tag Team Championship (1 time) – Cheech and Cloudy
NWA Upstate/ Upstate Pro Wrestling
NWA Upstate Tag Team Championship (1 time) – Cheech and Cloudy
Squared Circle Wrestling
2CW Tag Team Championship (1 time) – Cheech and Cloudy
UWA Hardcore Wrestling
UWA Tag Team Championship (1 time) – Cheech and Cloudy
Upstate Pro Wrestling
UPW Tag Team Championship (1 time) – Cheech and Cloudy

References

External links

Independent promotions teams and stables
Ring of Honor teams and stables